The Minister for Transport is a senior minister in the Government of Ireland and leads the Department of Transport.

The current Minister for Transport is Eamon Ryan, TD. He is also Minister for the Environment, Climate and Communications.

Ryan is assisted by Jack Chambers, TD, Minister of State for International and Road Transport and Logistics.

Overview
The Minister and the department are responsible for implementing an integrated transport policy. 

Specific responsibilities which come under the aegis of the Minister for Transport in relation to national roads and to road transport in general include: delivering on the national roads programme as part of the national development plan; implementing the government's road safety strategy and related policies for the regulation of vehicle standards; road haulage licensing; driver licensing; and driver testing.

In respect of aviation policy, the department is responsible for ensuring that aviation practices and procedures comply with the best international standards; promoting the development of a vibrant, competitive and progressively regulated aviation sector and the provision of adequate airport infrastructure and competitive airport services.

In respect of Maritime Transport, the department is responsible for establishing, promoting, regulating and enforcing Maritime Safety and Security Standards, providing emergency response services and safeguarding the Maritime Environment. It is also responsible for ports and shipping policy.

List of office-holders
The Department of Transport and Power was created by the Ministers and Secretaries (Amendment) Act 1959. On 2 January 1984, the Department of Transport was abolished under the Ministers and Secretaries (Amendment) Act 1983 and its functions transferred to the Department of Communications.

The Department of the Public Service was created by the Ministers and Secretaries (Amendment) Act 1973. In 1987, the functions of the Department of Public Service were transferred to the Department of Finance, and the statutory shell used for the formation of the Department of Transport. The subsequent changes to the department name and functions are shown in detail at the departmental page.

References

External links
Department of Transport

Government ministers of the Republic of Ireland
Lists of government ministers of Ireland
Minister
Ireland
Minister